Several languages of the Greater Antilles, specifically in Cuba and Hispaniola, appear to have preceded the Arawakan Taíno. Almost nothing is known of them, though a couple recorded words, along with a few toponyms, suggest they were not Arawakan or Cariban, the families of the attested languages of the Antilles. Three languages are recorded: Guanahatabey, Macoris (or Macorix, apparently in two dialects), and Ciguayo.

Languages
There were three pre-Arawakan populations at the time of the Spanish Conquest, and they were extinct within a century. These were
 the Guanahatabey of western Cuba (sometimes confused with the Arawakan Ciboney),
 the Macorix (Mazorij) in two populations: the Pedernales Peninsula and northeastern Hispaniola (modern Dominican Republic), and 
 the Ciguayo (Siwayo) of northeastern Hispaniola (Samaná Peninsula).

They were evidently completely mutually unintelligible with Taíno. Ciguayo and Macorix were apparently moribund when chronicler De las Casas arrived on the island in 1502. He wrote in his Historia (1527–1559),

("It is worth noting here that a large section of this coast, at least 25 or 30 leagues, and a good 15 or maybe 20 wide, up to the hills which together with the Great Plain make up this part of the coast, was populated by peoples known as Mazorij, and others [known as] Ciguayos, and they had different languages than the one common to the entire island. I do not remember if they differed [from each other] in language, as it has been many years, and there is not a single person today to ask, as I have spoken often enough with both generations, and more than 50 years have passed.")

However, elsewhere he notes that the neighboring languages were not intelligible with each other.
("Three languages on this island [of Hispaniola] were distinct, in that they could not understand one another; the first was that of the people [of the region] we called the Lower Macorix, and the other that of their neighbors of the Upper Macorix [the Ciguayos], which we described above as the 4th and 6th provinces; the other language [Taíno] was the universal one of all the land".)

Classification
Little else is known of the languages apart from the word for ‘gold’ in Ciguayo, tuob, mentioned in the sentence immediately preceding the first passage above:

("Here they don't call gold caona, as in the first part of this island, nor nozay as in the islet of Guanahani or San Salvador, but tuob.")

Both the Arawak and Carib languages had a simple -syllable structure, suggesting that Ciguayo was not just unintelligible, but actually of a different language family than the two known languages of the Caribbean. Granberry (1991) has speculated that they may have been related, not to the languages of South America as Taíno was, but to languages of Central America which had more similar syllable structures. Western Cuba is close enough to the Yucatán Peninsula for crossings by canoe at the time of the Conquest, and indeed a genetic study in 2020 suggested a Central American origin of the pre-Arawakan population.

In Ciguayo, there is also the proper name Quisqueya (Kiskeya), and in Macorix a negative form, baeza. The Guanahani Taino (Ciboney in the proper sense) word for ‘gold’, nozay, elsewhere spelled nuçay (nosai, nusai), may be of Warao origin, as the Warao word for ‘gold’ is naséi simo ('yellow pebble'). However, trade words like 'gold' are readily borrowed.

See also
Waroid languages

References

 
Extinct languages of North America
Unclassified languages of North America
Indigenous languages of the Caribbean
History of the Caribbean
Pre-Columbian cultural areas
Caribbean studies